Metrication (or metrification) is the process of introducing the International System of Units, also known as SI units or the metric system, to replace a jurisdiction's traditional measuring units. U.S. customary units have been defined in terms of metric units since the 19th century, and the SI has been the "preferred system of weights and measures for United States trade and commerce" since 1975 according to United States law. However, conversion was not mandatory and many industries chose not to convert, and U.S. customary units remain in common use in many industries as well as in governmental use (for example, speed limits are still posted in miles per hour). Unlike other countries, there is no governmental or major social desire to implement further metrication.

Although customary units are used more often than metric units in the U.S., the SI system is used extensively in some fields such as science, medicine, electronics, the military, automobile production and repair, and international affairs. Post-1994 federal law also mandates most packaged consumer goods be labeled in both customary and metric units.

History

18th century

Immediately after independence, the United States used a variety of units of measure, including Dutch units and English units. The 1789 Constitution grants Congress the authority to determine standards of measure, though it did not immediately use this authority to impose a uniform system. The United States was one of the first nations to adopt a decimal currency, under the Coinage Act of 1792.

In 1793, Thomas Jefferson requested artifacts from France that could be used to adopt the metric system in the United States, and Joseph Dombey was sent from France with a standard kilogram. Before reaching the United States, Dombey's ship was blown off course by a storm and captured by pirates, and he died in captivity on Montserrat.

19th century

In 1832, the customary system of units was formalized.
In the early 19th century, the U.S. Coast and Geodetic Survey, the government's surveying and map-making agency, used a meter standard ("Committee Meter", French: Mètre des Archives) brought from Switzerland. Shortly after the American Civil War, the 39th United States Congress protected the use of the metric system in commerce with the Metric Act of 1866 and supplied each state with a set of standard metric weights and measures.

In 1875 the United States solidified its commitment to the development of the internationally recognized metric system by becoming one of the original seventeen signatory nations to the Metre Convention, also known as the Treaty of the Metre. The signing of this international agreement concluded five years of meetings in which the metric system was reformulated, refining the accuracy of its standards. The Metre Convention established the International Bureau of Weights and Measures (Bureau international des poids et mesures, BIPM) in Sèvres, France, to provide standards of measurement for worldwide use.

Under the Mendenhall Order of 1893, metric standards, developed through international cooperation under the auspices of BIPM, were officially adopted as the fundamental standards for length and mass in the United States, though some metric standards were used in practice before then. The definitions of United States customary units, such as the foot and pound, have been based on metric units since then.

The 1895 Constitution of Utah, in Article X, Section 11, originally mandated that: "The Metric System shall be taught in the public schools of the State." This section was repealed, effective July 1, 1987.

On July 4, 1876, Melvil Dewey (known for his Dewey Decimal Classification) incorporated the American Metric Bureau in Boston to sell rulers and other metric measuring tools. Dewey had hoped to make his fortune selling metric supplies.

20th century

The General Conference on Weights and Measures is the governing body for the modern metric system and comprises the signing nations of the Treaty of the Metre. The General Conference on Weights and Measures approved an updated version of the metric system in 1960 named Le Système international d'unités (International System of Units) and abbreviated SI.

On February 10, 1964, the National Bureau of Standards (now known as the National Institute of Standards and Technology) issued a statement that it would use the metric system, except where this would have an obvious detrimental effect.

In 1968 Congress authorized the U.S. Metric Study, a three-year study of systems of measurement in the United States, with emphasis on the feasibility of metrication. The United States Department of Commerce conducted the study. A 45-member advisory panel consulted and took testimony from hundreds of consumers, business organizations, labor groups, manufacturers, and state and local officials. The final report of the study concluded that the U.S. would eventually join the rest of the world in the use of the metric system of measurement. The study found that metric units were already implemented in many areas and that their use was increasing. The majority of study participants believed that conversion to the metric system was in the best interests of the United States, particularly in view of the importance of foreign trade and the increasing influence of technology in the United States.

The U.S. Metric Study recommended that the United States implement a carefully planned transition to the principal use of the metric system over a decade. Congress passed the Metric Conversion Act of 1975 "to coordinate and plan the increasing use of the metric system in the United States". Voluntary conversion was initiated, and the United States Metric Board (USMB) was established for planning, coordination, and public education. The public education component led to public awareness of the metric system, but the public response included resistance, apathy, and confusion. In 1981 the USMB reported to Congress that it lacked the clear Congressional mandate necessary to bring about national conversion. Because of this ineffectiveness and an effort of the Reagan administration—particularly from Lyn Nofziger's efforts as a White House advisor to the Reagan administration, to reduce federal spending—the USMB was disbanded in the autumn of 1982.

The ending of the USMB increased doubts that metrication would really be implemented. Public and private sector metrication slowed even while competitiveness between nations and demands of global marketplaces increased.

The American National Metric Council (ANMC) was established in 1973 by the American National Standards Institute (ANSI) as a non-profit, tax-exempt organization for planning and coordinating metric activity in all sectors of the U.S. economy. The ANMC became a separately incorporated organization in 1976. The ANMC was intended to facilitate U.S. metrication by maintaining a voluntary and orderly process that minimizes costs and maximizes benefits, and to provide information, forums, individual assistance, and other services for its subscribers.

The ANMC attempted to coordinate the metric planning of many industrial sectors, unlike the USMB, which only attempted to implement the policy set forth in the Metric Conversion Act of 1975. After the formation of the USMB, committees of the ANMC submitted conversion plans for the chemical sector and for the instruments sector. These sector conversion plans were later approved by the USMB. From 1975 through 1987, the ANMC held a series of well-attended annual conferences. Subsequently, a series of National Metric Conferences, jointly sponsored by the ANMC, the U.S. Metric Association (USMA), the Department of Commerce, and the National Institute of Standards and Technology (NIST), were held from 1989 through 1993.

Congress included new encouragement for U.S. industrial metrication in the Omnibus Foreign Trade and Competitiveness Act of 1988. This legislation amended the Metric Conversion Act of 1975 and designated the metric system as "the Preferred system of weights and measures for United States trade and commerce". The legislation states that the federal government has a responsibility to assist industry, especially small business, as it voluntarily converts to the metric system of measurement. The legislation required most federal agencies to use the metric system in their procurement, grants, and other business-related activities by the end of 1992.

While not mandating metric use in the private sector, the federal government has sought to serve as a catalyst in the metric conversion of the country's trade, industry, and commerce. Exceptions were made for the highway and construction industries. The Department of Transportation planned to require metric units by 2000, but this plan was canceled by the 1998 highway bill TEA21. The U.S. military has generally high use of the metric system, partly because of the need to work with other nations' militaries.

Executive Order 12770, signed by President George H. W. Bush on July 25, 1991, citing the Metric Conversion Act, directed departments and agencies within the executive branch of the United States Government to "take all appropriate measures within their authority" to use the metric system "as the preferred system of weights and measures for United States trade and commerce", and authorized the Secretary of Commerce "to charter an Interagency Council on Metric Policy ("ICMP"), which will assist the Secretary in coordinating Federal Government-wide implementation of this order."

Some members of Congress attempted to ban use of the metric system on federal highways in 1992 and 1993. These bills were not popular in the House of Representatives and failed before a vote.

The use of two different unit systems caused the loss of the Mars Climate Orbiter in 1999. NASA specified metric units in the contract. NASA and other organizations applied metric units in their work, but one subcontractor, Lockheed Martin, provided software that calculated and reported thruster performance data to the team in pound-force-seconds, rather than the expected newton-seconds.

21st century

The effort toward national metrication is based on the premise that the U.S. industrial and commercial productivity, mathematics and science education, and the competitiveness of its products and services in world markets would be enhanced by adopting the metric system. Gerard Iannelli, director of the U.S. Metric Program, gave the opinion that Americans have so far not done so because of the effort it takes to "translate" from customary to metric units when both measurements are not shown. He also cited what he perceived to be ineffective attempts at public education and awareness.

In June 2010 NIST called for an amendment to the Fair Packaging and Labeling Act that would allow manufacturers the option to voluntarily label their packages solely in metric units, rather than being dual-labeled with U.S. customary units and metric units as is currently required. The goal of these changes would be to encourage metric labeling, leading to greater agreement of U.S. labeling laws and simplifying domestic and international commerce. NIST Metric Program coordinator Elizabeth Gentry added that the proposed changes were "in response to requests by U.S. manufacturers and consumers", particularly that "manufacturers want to take control of the limited net quantity of contents real estate on their packaging."

In December 2012, a petition was created on the White House's petitioning system, petitioning the White House to "Make the Metric system the standard in the United States, instead of the Imperial system." On January 10, 2013, this petition garnered over 25,000 signatures, exceeding the threshold needed to require the Obama Administration to officially respond to the petition. Patrick D. Gallagher, director of the National Institute of Standards and Technology, provided the official response stating that customary units were defined in the metric system, thus making the nation "bilingual" in terms of measurement systems. Gallagher also said that using the metric system was a choice to be made by individuals.

Early in 2013, state Representative Karl Rhoads introduced bill HB36 into the Hawaii House of Representatives that sought to make the metric system mandatory within his state. Called "Relating to the Metric System", the bill stipulated that the law would come into effect on January 1, 2018. By June 2014, bill HB36 had not gained enough support and was considered dead. However, in January 2019, Rhoads presented bill SB428 to the Hawaii State Legislature, saying that "strong reasons exist for Hawaii and other states to switch to the metric system". It was proposed to establish a task force to explore the use of the metric system for distance and speed measurements on public signs. If either bill had become law, Hawaii would have been the first state to introduce the metric system on a broad scale.

In January 2015, Oregon State Senator Brian Boquist, at the request of metric enthusiast David Pearl, proposed Oregon Senate Bill 166, which was similar to the Hawaiian bill. It would have established the International System of Units as the official units of measurement within the State of Oregon. The bill was in committee upon adjournment on July 6, 2015.

During Lincoln Chafee's 2016 presidential election campaign, he advocated for the switch to metric units. Following a widely panned debate performance and poor polling numbers, Chafee announced on October 23, 2015, that he would be ending his campaign.

Current use

Daily life
Most Americans have studied the common metric units at school. Also, newer units introduced by engineers and scientists from the 18th century on, such as volts, megapixels, and kilotons and megatons of TNT, are generally formulated in terms of powers of 10.

Use of units based on the SI is widespread for many applications. Residential electric power plans use kilowatt hours. The luminous flux from lamps is specified in lumens, derived from the candela rather than the candle.

The letter K is commonly used to denote "thousand" (e.g., "She earns $80K"), even though this is inconsistent with the lowercase "k" in SI. This usage has largely replaced the letter "G" (for "grand", used almost exclusively for money) and the Roman numeral M that was commonly used for "thousand" before the 1960s; in fact, the "M" has now come to denote "million" (e.g., "$32.5M budget").

Weather
Televised and radio weather reports are given in degrees Fahrenheit instead of Celsius for dew point and air temperatures, miles per hour for wind speed, inches of mercury for atmospheric pressure (millibars are used only when reporting tropical phenomena such as hurricanes), and other customary units. In some northern border states, temperatures are described in both Fahrenheit and Celsius for the benefit of the cross-border Canadian audiences. Web-based and mobile weather forecasts typically can be switched to metric units.

Consumer and retail

Some U.S. consumer products come in round metric sizes. This appears to be increasing because of the international nature of manufacturing, distribution, and sales. Many items are produced in round metric quantities and some manufacturers opt to display the metric quantity first or more prominently (e.g., Oral-B Glide dental floss is available in 35-, 40-, and 50-meter packages).

Perhaps the most common metric item sold is the two-liter bottle. Some supermarket chains also make their store brand soft drinks available in 3-liter sizes. Soft drink containers of 1 and 0.5 liters (and more recently 1.25 liter bottles) are increasingly sold alongside 12 fl oz, 16 fl oz, 20 fl oz, and 24 fl oz (355, 473, 591 and 710 mL) sizes.

The half-liter water bottle (16.9 fl oz) has nearly replaced the 16 ounce size. 700 mL (23.6 fl oz) and one-liter sizes are also common, though 20 fl oz, and 24 fl oz sizes remain popular, particularly in vending machines.

Attempts to sell 3- or 4-liter jugs of milk, instead of gallons (3.785 L), have been largely unsuccessful, and such bottles are rarely seen in the United States. Milk remains sold in binary divisions of the gallon, with half-pints, pints, quarts and half-gallons being the primary sizes.

Shampoo, mouthwash, and dental floss have begun to be sold in metric sizes. PowerBars and similar products have always been sold (but not marketed) by the gram.

Nutritional food labels typically report serving sizes in both systems but only list metric values (g or mg) for the breakdown of individual nutrients.

Alcohol 
Wine is sold in standard bottles of 750 mL, as in the rest of the world. A fifth of liquor, once one-fifth of a U.S. gallon, or 757 mL, is now commonly 750 mL, though it is still referred to as "a fifth". Beer is sold in fluid ounce denominations. Regulations are set by the Alcohol and Tobacco Tax and Trade Bureau which controls the permissible sizes of containers. Unlike non-alcoholic beverages, most alcohol products are not required to carry unit conversions on labels.

Non-packaged foods 
Loose fruits and vegetables are near universally priced either per pound or per item. In both supermarkets and steakhouses, cuts of meat are sold in ounces and pounds. Loosely sold goods need not carry a unit conversion.

In some agricultural areas, pecks or bushels can denote quantities of apples etc. by dry volume.

Fair Packaging and Labeling Act
Since 1992, the federal Fair Packaging and Labeling Act (FPLA) has required most packaged consumer goods to be labeled in both customary and metric units. Some industries are engaged in efforts to amend this law to allow manufacturers to use only metric labeling. Forty-eight U.S. states have adopted laws permitting labeling in only metric units, the two exceptions being New York and Alabama.

Electronics 
The electronics and computer industries largely converted to metric standards as new technologies were introduced toward the end of the 20th century, also driven in part by a shift in manufacturing from the U.S. to countries in Asia with metric standards.

Display sizes for screens on TVs and computer monitors are advertised and sold in inches (measured diagonally), although most boxes also state the size in centimeters.

The original  phone connector jack dates back to 1878 and still sees use in audio equipment and electric instruments. In many respects, it has been superseded by the 3.5 mm connectors or 2.5 mm headset, which was common on older mobile phones.

While early floppy disks had a nominal package size of 5 inches (approximately 130 mm), the nominal design diameter of the replacement "3 inch" disks was actually 90 mm. CDs and DVDs are 120 mm in diameter, but their size is rarely mentioned; mini CDs are sometimes called 80 mm CDs.

Computer fan sizes are exclusively referred to by metric units (120 mm or 80 mm case fans, for example), while hard disk drive and CD drive bay sizes are customary measurements, typically 3 inches and 5 inches, respectively. The newer 2 inch and 1.8 inch drive bays are specified in metric and use metric mounting screws. Newer SSDs in the M.2 form factor are measured in millimeters (ex: "M.2 2280" is 22 mm wide by 80 mm long).

Consumer-size photographic film is commonly sold in a 35 mm standard (24×36 mm negative), although print sizes and large format films are defined in inches. Digital camera sensor sizes are measured in an archaic manner indicating inverse fractions of an inch representing the diameter of an equivalent vidicon tube. For example, a  sensor is larger than a  sensor. However, lenses are marked in terms of focal length in millimeters (e.g., average natural human field of view is a lens with 35–50 mm focal length for 35 mm film).

The weight of vinyl phonograph records is reported in grams. The tracking force and anti-skating settings on a turntable are measured in grams-force.

Clothing 
Clothing is measured in inches, not centimeters. American shoe sizes are measured on different scales for children, men, and women but all sizes are derived from inches. Major multi-national apparel brands including Nike, Adidas, Hanes, and Levi's often sell the same inventory worldwide, with tags containing both SI and customary units.

Bedding 
Mattress sizes use non-numeric labels, such as king, queen, full, or twin. These sizes are defined in inches, unlike most other countries, which use similar labels defined using metric units. The FPLA mandates bed sheets state the type of bed they are intended for in addition to dimensions in centimeters and inches. The FPLA also mandates dual scales on many other woven goods such as towels.

Construction
Of all industries, construction has adopted metric units the least. Dimensional lumber comes in standard nominal inch cross-section sizes and lengths are given in feet. Although model building codes—such as the International Building Code—provide information in both customary and metric units, locally developed building code amendments and zoning codes often provide customary units exclusively. Because of Canada's proximity to the U.S., issues of common units still arise. This tendency in construction is similar to Japan, an otherwise metricated country where traditional construction still uses Japanese units predating metrication.

Aviation
Aircraft altitudes for air traffic control and related purposes are measured in feet in the U.S. In fact, most of the world has used feet for aviation altitudes since the end of World War II (meters before 1945 in all European countries except the UK), with the notable exceptions of China, North Korea, and many CIS (former Soviet) countries. For instance, an airliner on a long flight, even if neither its starting point nor destination are in the United States, might use a nominal cruising altitude of 36,000 feet, using an internationally standardized system of flight levels (Flight Level 360 in this case). In 2011, Russia switched from metric to foot-denominated flight levels at high altitude to eliminate the need for adjustments when crossing in to or out of its airspace.

Commercial aviation
Frequent-flyer programs from commercial airlines in the United States, such as American Airlines' AAdvantage and Delta's SkyMiles, are commonly managed using miles. This is likely to continue; in fact, some international airlines that previously used kilometers are switching to miles or using both, to simplify the redemption of miles with United States-based airline partners. Aircraft speed is often measured in knots and elevation in feet (flight level) in many countries.

For both domestic and international routes, U.S. airlines set luggage size and weight restrictions in terms of customary units. Conversely, international airlines that fly to the U.S. often restrict baggage to metric sizes.

The temperatures in aviation-related weather reports are given in degrees Celsius in the United States.

For carry-on luggage, the Transportation Security Administration restricts liquids to 3.4 fluid ounces (100 mL). Originally, the agency planned to restrict to 3 oz / 89 mL but switched it to 3.4 oz / 100 mL after pressure from the European Union.

Education
Most students are given some level of introduction to the metric system in elementary, middle, and high school, but the emphasis varies. Instruction primarily centers on the concepts of powers of 10, the associated prefixes, and the conversion from one prefix form to another. Units of length, volume, and mass are typically introduced through comparison with ordinary objects. The metric system is not reinforced much outside the classroom due to lack of popular metric use. Consequently, while students may understand some of the concepts underlying the metric system, they do not necessarily have an intuitive sense of the value of the units.

In science education, students predominantly use metric measures in experiments and equations, allowing those interested in the sciences to become more familiar with the metric system. A few science course credits are requisites for an undergraduate degree in the U.S. which ensures most educated people have some exposure to the metric system. Within higher education, the metric system is universal for classes in the sciences (see below), except for exercises designed to illustrate complex conversions. Engineering programs still widely use English Engineering Units, but this varies depending on the field. Electrical Engineering programs mostly use metric, while fields such as aerospace, materials, thermal, and manufacturing engineering use customary units extensively. Some non-science textbooks in the U.S. use only the metric system without giving conversions in order to promote metrication.

Electricity and energy
There are no U.S. customary units for electric current, potential difference, or charge since these concepts were developed after the international adoption of metric in science. The metric units ampere, volt, ohm and coulomb are the only units used. The SI term hertz has replaced the term cycles per second for the same unit of frequency.

Energy is often measured in watt hours (SI-based), calories (SI-based), BTUs (customary) or therms (customary) rather than the SI joule. Residential and commercial electrical energy use is metered and billed in kilowatt hours, kW·h, as in most metric countries. Force measurements regularly use the pound instead of the SI newton; torque is measured in pound-feet. Fuel prices are mostly given in customary units, such as dollars per gallon, barrel, thousand cubic feet, or ton (short or long). Heating, cooling, and combustion are often measured in BTUs per hour or refrigeration tons, and powerplant efficiency is often measured by its "heat rate", in BTU per kilowatt hour. The rated power of engines, electric motors, and power plant steam turbines is frequently measured in horsepower. Power plant output is generally expressed in megawatts.

Financial services
Some market prices, basically of primary unprocessed materials, are quoted in customary units (such as barrels of oil, troy ounces of gold, pounds of frozen pork bellies, etc.). The federal government reports international production figures in metric units (for instance, wheat in metric tons) but in bushels for domestic production figures.

Firearms
The U.S. uses both the inch and millimeter for caliber on civilian and law enforcement firearms.
Historically, ammunition rounds designed in the United States were denoted by their caliber in inches (e.g., .45 Colt and .270 Winchester.) Two developments changed this tradition: the large preponderance of different cartridges using an identical caliber and the international arms trade bringing metric calibers to the United States. The former led to bullet diameter (rather than caliber) often being used to describe rounds to differentiate otherwise similar rounds. A good example is the .308 Winchester, which fires the same .30-caliber projectile as the .30-06 Springfield and the .300 Savage. Occasionally, the caliber is just a number close to the diameter of the bullet, like the .220 Swift, .223 Remington and .222 Remington Magnum, all of which actually have .22 caliber or  bullets.

The second development is actual metric calibers being introduced to the United States. 6 mm and 7 mm caliber rifles are particularly popular as are 9 mm and 10 mm caliber handguns. These metric caliber rounds are either described by their metric caliber, such as the very popular 7mm Remington Magnum round or have their bullet diameter converted into inches, such as the also extremely popular .243 Winchester. Occasionally, U.S.-designed inch-caliber rounds are stated in metric as well.

The U.S. military, reflecting its need to ensure interoperability with its NATO allies, uses metric measurements for almost all weapons calibers, even for calibers that originated as or were derived from a different measurement (e.g. 7.62 mm rather than .308, or 5.56 mm instead of .223). However, civilian rifles chambered for .223 Remington may load military 5.56 mm ammunition but not fire it safely because 5.56 mm NATO ammunition is loaded to create greater chamber pressure than .223 Remington. Controversy exists whether this is true for civilian rifles chambered for .308 Winchester firing 7.62×51 mm NATO military ammunition. Major handloading manuals in the U.S. use U.S. customary units for all pertinent measurements including bullet diameter, cartridge overall length, powder charge weight, velocity, and maximum pressure, even with European-designed fully metric rounds.

Gemstones
Gemstones and pearls are sold in metric carats.

Manufacturing
Globalization of manufacturing has led to wide adoption of metric standards, although this is not yet universal. After a period where automobiles were assembled with both customary and metric fasteners in each vehicle, cars are now universally built with metric parts. Automobile engines were once named after their displacement in cubic inches. For example, the Chrysler "426 Hemi" engine would be described as 7 liters in modern terminology. Technical publications by industry publishers and American automakers often give engine displacements in cubic inches as well as cubic centimeters (which are equivalent to milliliters), or liters.

Military
The U.S. military uses metric measurements extensively to ensure interoperability with allied forces, particularly NATO Standardization Agreements (STANAG). Ground forces have measured distances in "klicks", slang for kilometers, since 1918. Most military firearms are measured in metric units, beginning with the M-14 which was introduced in 1957, although there are a few legacy exceptions, such as .50-caliber guns. Aircraft ordnance is normally measured in pounds. Heavy weapon caliber is measured in millimeters. Military vehicles are generally built to metric standards. An exception is the U.S. Navy, whose guns are measured in inches and whose undersea fleet measures distances in terms of "kiloyards" (equivalent to 914.4 m), depth as "feet", and velocity, in some cases, as "feet per second". The Navy and Air Force continue to measure distance in nautical miles and speed in knots; these units are now accepted for use with SI by the BIPM. Furthermore, in military aviation NATO countries use feet for flight heights, as they do in the civilian aviation.

Money

The United States dollar is fully decimal, being divided into 10 dimes, 100 cents (¢), and (for accounting purposes) 1000 mills (₥); this mirrors the decimal divisions of metric units with the prefixes deci-, centi-, and milli-. Coins are currently minted in 1, 5, 10, 25, 50, and 100-cent increments. Banknotes are currently minted in 1, 2, 5, 10, 20, 50, and 100-dollar increments; these numbers follow the pattern of being factors of 10 (1, 2, or 5) multiplied by a power of 10 (1, 10, or 100).

Illegal drugs and controlled substances
Illegal drugs and controlled substances are often measured in metric quantities. The federal law prohibiting them defines the penalties in metric masses.

In everyday use within its subculture, marijuana is sold using a combination of metric and US customary units. At small scales the basic unit is the gram (or fractions thereof), but for larger orders fractions of ounces and pounds are used. Informally  ounce is often defined in turn as 3.5 grams (an approximate 1.25% rounding error) and referred to simply as "an eighth". The practice of using grams or ounces depending on the size is also common in states that have legalized marijuana. For example, California allows possession of "an ounce" (legally rounded to 28.5 g) of recreational marijuana but only 8 g of concentrate.

The strength of a tab of LSD is almost always expressed in micrograms.

E-juice, used to provide nicotine and vapor in electronic smoking devices, is sold by the milliliter. Some places also require products to display nicotine concentration. In Utah, vape shops are required to have information explaining the difference between mg/mL and percent by volume concentrations.

Science
In science, metric use is essentially universal, though additional specialized units are often used for specific purposes in various disciplines (such as the parsec and light year in astronomy), consistent with worldwide use. Laboratories in the United States almost exclusively use the metric system and SI, such as the Celsius and Kelvin scales for temperature.

Earth sciences, such as hydrology and geology, continue to use customary units for field surveying, due both to the legacy of many decades of data collection and to the need to work with the construction industry, which has not adopted the metric system. American irrigation engineers, for example, talk in acre-feet and cubic feet per second, whereas most other irrigation engineers  would refer to gigalitres and cubic metres per second.

Meteorology extensively uses both metric and customary units. The METAR reporting system in use in the United States differs from the one used by the World Meteorological Organization (WMO) in that wind speeds are delivered in knots (instead of meters per second), water-equivalent precipitation in hundredths of an inch, and altimeter setting in the customary inches of mercury (instead of hectopascals). Temperatures are reported in whole degrees Fahrenheit but are converted to Celsius when encoded in METAR reports. Most synoptic observation charts are expressed in SI units, except for the aforementioned wind speeds, which must be converted for the purposes of calculation. 

Upper-air temperature charts typically use the Celsius scale (the freezing line is of great importance at lower levels of the atmosphere in determining precipitation type) while potential temperature charts use the kelvin; both of these are in line with international usage. Atmospheric vorticity is typically measured in full rotations per 100,000 seconds (a rough metrication of the day) but does not use the SI-recommended radian.

National Weather Service and TV/radio broadcast public forecasts are given almost exclusively in customary units: degrees Fahrenheit for temperature and dewpoint, fractions of an inch of rain or ice and whole inches of snow (less than an inch often indicated by fractions or informal terms like "dusting" when very low), inches of mercury; and for wind speeds, miles per hour, except in marine forecasts, in which knots are used. Wave heights are measured in feet. 

Actual sleet and snowfall and their depths on the ground are measured in tenths of an inch, with actual rainfall in hundredths, and ice accretion in either fractions or decimals. Hailstone sizes are typically reported without a fixed unit of measure; they are instead compared to familiar round or spherical items (e.g. dime-sized or golf ball-sized). Barometer readings for hurricanes are usually given in millibars (mb), which are equal to hectopascals (hPa), or ten times the kilopascals (kPa) used in neighboring Canada; the use of inches of mercury in such applications is rapidly declining.

In early 2007, NASA announced that it would use metric units for all operations on the lunar surface upon its return to the Moon, then projected for 2020. NASA's lunar return program was then canceled in 2010.

Medicine 
The medical field uses predominantly metric units. When interacting with patients certain data, such as their height and weight, is presented in customary units.

Pharmacology 
Both prescription and non-prescription dosages of pills are always measured in the SI system with the most common unit being the milligram. Smaller dosages use micrograms. Because the SI prefix μ (mu) is not well known among many Americans and is not available on most keyboards the medical industry uses the abbreviation mcg to denote micrograms.

For vitamins, nutrient amounts are given in gram denominations or WHO standardized international units, known as IU.

The sizes of pill containers, when occasionally spoken of, are predominantly discussed in terms of fluid drams, although most also contain cubic centimeters and sometimes fluid ounces on the specifications.

For a long time, liquid dosages of medication were displayed in terms of both milliliters and the customary units of teaspoons and tablespoons, which are standardized as equal to 5 and 15 mL respectively. However, many people colloquially refer to the small spoon in a utensil set as the teaspoon and the big spoon as the tablespoon. After a major analysis in 2015, it was found that the inclusion of tea/tablespoon dosages likely encourages some people to use non-calibrated kitchen utensils as measuring devices. Due to this and reported confusion with the abbreviations TSP and TBSP, the FDA now recommends doctors and pharmaceutical manufacturers use milliliter only dosing instructions. To assist in this transition, drug makers and pharmacies are encouraged to include a disposable measuring cup with liquid medications.

Concentrations and bloodwork 
Medicine dosage guidelines are specified in terms of milligrams per kilogram. The exact metric unit used by healthcare professionals in the U.S. does occasionally vary compared to other countries. For example, U.S. diabetes mellitus patients measure their blood sugar levels in milligrams per deciliter (as with cholesterol and other blood concentrations), whereas most other countries use millimoles per liter. American blood glucose meters have the ability to switch between the two.

Blood and urine samples are taken by the milliliter. Intravenous therapy (IV) is dispensed by the milliliter. To avoid confusion, a 1-liter bag is denoted as "1000 mL".

Height and weight 
Anthropometric data such as height may be recorded in centimeters. The body mass index (BMI) is expressed in kg/m2, even though it may be computed from pounds and inches. Even if the medical practice takes height and weight data in terms of SI units, it is almost always discussed with the patient in terms of customary units. Exercise is commonly discussed with patients in terms of miles walked. Intake of sugar, sodium, and other nutrients is usually discussed in terms of grams and milligrams.

Use among veterinarians varies. Because of heavy public interaction, animal weights (e.g., for cats or dogs) are nearly always recorded and reported in pounds and ounces. Usage at veterinary teaching hospitals favors SI units.

Dentistry 
Measurements of tooth locations/movement and periodontal (gum health) charts are in millimeters.

Blood pressure 

Blood pressure is measured in millimeters of mercury.

Sound
Accurate sound level measurement devices were not invented until after the microphone or for that matter after the proliferation of the SI system in physics and internationally. Hence, although certain information on sound pressure can theoretically be evaluated in terms of pounds per square inch (PSI), this is virtually never done. Instead, the internationally used decibel (dB) scale is most common. In some cases where there is a desire for a non-logarithmic scale, the decibel-related sone scale is used. For example, appliance noise level is usually rated in terms of sone output. Hearing protection must be labeled in terms of decibel reduction with more detailed charts displaying decibel reduction at given hertz frequencies.

Sports
U.S. citizens are frequently exposed to metric units through coverage of international sporting events, particularly the Olympic Games and FIFA World Cup.

While the track and field Olympic Trials have always been conducted in metric distances to duplicate the competition the selected athletes are destined for, the National Championships changed to metric in 1974. However, USA Track & Field (USATF) continued to calculate the national championships in the high jump in U.S. customary units until 2002. The National Collegiate Athletic Association (NCAA) switched its measurement system at the National Championship level in 1976. The final holdout was the National Federation of State High School Associations (NFHS) administering high school sports, which switched to metric in 1980.

U.S. track-and-field competitions are commonly run in increments of 400 meters, which roughly correspond to traditional mile-based lengths. In the Olympics, athletes run 1500 meters, not 1600 meters.

Running races in the U.S. are usually run in metric distances (e.g., the 100 meters dash or the 5K run), although the mile distance remains popular. Even 5 and 10 kilometer races most often have mile markers on the course, and no kilometer markers. Long-distance races are often measured in kilometers, although exceptions exist (generally 10 mile races). The marathon is referred to as a 26.219-mile race (the official marathon standard distance originally being in English units — 26 miles, 385 yards) rather than 42.195 km. Ultramarathons are measured in either miles or kilometers, with little standardization either way.

Although the Olympics and U.S. track events have been metric for years, it is still common for sports commentators to provide conversions to help the American audience understand the measurements.

Measured distances as used in events such as shot put, high jump, and discus throw are, however, often in feet and inches, except at the national and international levels. In 2017, the Florida High School Athletic Association became the first to resist this trend and use metric measures for field events. The field and court sizes for most popular team sports such as soccer were originally set in non-metric units. This is reflected in American football, in which the playing field is divided into yards, and many important statistics are measured in yards. Similarly, the dimensions for all baseball parks, basketball courts, tennis courts and ice hockey rinks are given in feet, golf courses in yards, auto racing tracks in miles (or fractions thereof), and horse racing in furlongs. The lengths of automobile races in the U.S. are generally set in miles. Some sporting equipment, such as skis and poles, is sold in metric units.

A novelty American football game was attempted in metric units in 1977. That concept failed to gain acceptance.

Bicycles, especially at the high end, are increasingly being sold and sized in metric units. For example, a frame described as "21 inch" size in the past is now often labeled as a "53 cm" frame instead. Some bicycle wheels are labeled in metric as "700c" for a nominal 700 mm diameter road bike tire, but mountain bike wheels are still often sold in inches (26, 27.5, or 29 inches).

Common swimming pool dimensions are 25-yard, 25-meter, and 50-meter. The Olympic-size swimming pool is specified solely in meters. High schools and the NCAA conduct 25-yard competitions. USA Swimming (USA-S) swims in both metric and non-metric pools.

In the game of Ultimate Frisbee, the 175 g flying disc is seen as a standard of the sport.

The long-distance trail Mid State Trail has used metric units exclusively in its trail guide since 1973.

USA Weightlifting uses metric units to measure weight. Weights and dumbbells at gyms are labeled in pounds.

Transportation

Highway speed limits are posted in miles per hour and distances are largely displayed in miles, yards, or feet, although a few dual mile/km signs can be found, mostly remaining from demonstration projects that are no longer supported. One exception is Interstate 19 in Arizona, which is almost completely signed in metric, except for speed limit signs. Signage on this road is being converted back to customary units as it is replaced. Another exception is the turnpike section of Delaware Route 1, which uses a kilometer-based system, in anticipation of the mid-1990s conversion in the U.S. to the metric system, which did not happen. Distances were originally signed in kilometers, but have since been replaced with miles in 1995 and standard mile-markers in 2003. The exit numbers have remained metric starting at Dover Air Force Base northward to Interstate 95.

The 2000, 2003, and 2004 editions of the Manual on Uniform Traffic Control Devices (MUTCD) were published using both metric and US customary units. Metric signs, including speed signs in kilometers per hour, were displayed in the manual although they were not normally used on the roads and there was no definite plan to convert to metric. For visual distinction, regulatory and advisory metric speed signs have black circles around the numbers followed by "km/h" and other regulatory metric signs have yellow plates reading "metric" in black capitals on top of the main signs. Metric signs and metric measurements were removed for the 2009 edition and replaced with an appendix of metric conversion tables. This is in marked contrast to the position in the (largely metric) United Kingdom, where metric road signs are prohibited by law (except for those denoting widths and height restrictions, which include both metric and imperial units).

Newer signs on state highways on the Hawaiian island of Kauai also include distances in both miles and kilometers. Mile markers along highways on the Island of Hawaii will indicate both units whenever the whole kilometer corresponds approximately with the whole mile (e.g., 5 mi/8 km). In Houston, Texas, many speed limits have km/h signs underneath the MPH signs. These are located near both airports (Bush Intercontinental and Hobby) and in the Texas Medical Center. The U.S. territory of Puerto Rico generally uses American-style (MUTCD) signs with metric measurement on highways, displaying kilometer posts and distances in km, yet speed limit signs are in miles per hour. The Maine Turnpike used to use metric measurements on its highway signs in addition to customary measurements, partly to assist the large numbers of Canadian tourists who visit Maine's beaches. As of 2017 onwards, new or replaced signs include the distances in miles only.

The first signs in metric in the United States were posted on February 12, 1973, on Interstate 71 in Ohio.

Gasoline and diesel fuel are sold by the U.S. gallon, and fuel economy is rated in miles per gallon (MPG). In most other countries, using the metric system, fuel consumption is measured in liters per 100kilometers or kilometers per liter. The European Union official standard is liters per . Stations in Point Roberts, Washington, a short, noncontiguous peninsula that is road-accessible from the rest of the state of Washington only by crossing into Canada, sells its gasoline from pumps calibrated to dispense in liters. Gasoline is dispensed in liters in Puerto Rico. Automobile crankcase oil is sold by the quart, antifreeze by the gallon, brake fluid by the ounce (fluid), and air conditioning refrigerant by the ounce (mass). Windshield wiper replacement blades are measured in inches.

Domestic airline flights are assigned altitudes in feet and measure speed in knots. Nautical charts show depth in fathoms and use the nautical mile for distance. (One minute of arc of latitude at the radius of the earth at sea level was the standard for one nautical mile until about 1929. The nautical mile is now defined as exactly 1,852 meters.) Railroads use the standard gauge of 4 feet  inches, as does most of Europe (where it is expressed instead as 1,435 mm).

U.S. Federal Motor Vehicle Safety Standard 101, which governs vehicle controls and displays, permits speedometers to display miles per hour (MPH) or both MPH and km/h. In practice, most U.S.-market vehicles have mile odometers and dual-labeled speedometers with miles-per-hour as the primary calibration. Some 2000s era Buicks have a single speed gauge with a button on the instrument panel to switch the scale between MPH and km/h. Other vehicles have digital speedometers which can be set to read out speeds in either MPH or km/h.

Another common unit of speed is meters per second (m/s), used especially for lifts and cable cars. Odometers are permitted to record miles or kilometers, but must be clearly labeled as to which unit they record.

Tire inflation for passenger cars is typically about 30 pounds per square inch (psi) or 207 kilopascals (kPa). This is displayed on tires beside its metric equivalent. Post model year 2006 regulations also mandate an internationally standard "Tire and Loading Information" sticker which gives capacities in SI units followed by customary equivalents.

Hybrid units
Some measurements are reported in units derived from both customary and metric units. For example:
 Heat rate from a power plant: BTU/kWh
 Federal automobile exhaust emission standards: grams per mile
 Caffeine in beverages: milligrams per (fluid) ounce
 A standard method for sizing tires combines millimeters for overall width and inches for the wheel diameter on which they fit.
 In lighting, light bulbs use eighths of an inch for bulb diameter and full inches for fluorescent tube lengths, while the socket is always in millimeters (for example, the standard "medium Edison screw" is E26). On recently-introduced Christmas lights millimeters are often used with small globe-shaped bulbs (G30 and G40), and with miniature LED sets, where the standard T1 (-inch tube) ones are sometimes called M5 (5 mm miniature; not to be confused with M5 thread).

For properties understood more recently, such as those related to electricity, there is no traditional unit; international units are always used, often in combination with U.S. customary units. One among many examples is in Table 8, chapter 9, of the National Electrical Code Handbook (8th ed.), where resistance of conductors per unit length is given in ohms per thousand feet.

Other units are based on customary units, but use power-of-ten factors and metric prefixes. For example, distance to target for a U.S. submarine is expressed in kiloyards (kyd) rather than some combination of miles, yards, and feet. Telephone transmission line length and loop distances are measured in kilofeet. In some fields of civil engineering (especially structural engineering), and architecture, large loads and forces (such as the weight of a building or the amount of load applied to a column) are measured in kips (kilopounds or 1000 pounds-force) instead of short tons-force (2000 pounds-force), which are used in virtually all other non-metric industries in the United States, as well as in common usage among the public, when dealing with large values of force.

Cultural impact
The continuing use of U.S. customary units has caused writers to speculate in fiction set in the future about the adoption of the metric system. Many authors have assumed that the United States and the human race in general will use metric units. Others have assumed the continued use of U.S. customary units or have neglected to take metrication into account. Writers sometimes use customary units simply because American readers and watchers will understand the measurements; other times, they are simply used by accident. The 1966 show Star Trek, for instance, initially used U.S. customary units despite multiple Earth national origins and a setting in the 23rd century. Later, starting with "The Changeling", metric measures were used, albeit inconsistently. Later sequels of the show, such as Star Trek: The Next Generation, and Star Trek: Enterprise (set in the 22nd century), used the metric system exclusively.

Both the metric system and attitudes in the U.S. toward the metric system are a target of humorous jabs in shows such as The Simpsons, Futurama and The Big Bang Theory. A Saturday Night Live sketch titled "Decabet", released at the height of the metrication movement, lampooned the different metric measurements by introducing a new alphabet consisting of only ten letters.

In the 1994 film Pulp Fiction, Vincent Vega (John Travolta) tells Jules Winnfield (Samuel L. Jackson) that "Europe is a little different", because for example in Paris, they don't call it a "Quarter Pounder with Cheese" but a "Royale with Cheese" as "they've got the metric system, they don't know what the fuck a Quarter Pounder is". Later, Jules compliments the intelligence of one of their victims, after he correctly surmises that French use of the metric system is what precludes the term "Quarter Pounder".

Popular Science's September 2003 edition listed NIST's "Metric System Advocate" on its list of the "Worst Jobs in Science".

Advocacy groups 
 U.S. Metric Association

See also

 US Metric Association
 Frank Mankiewicz
 Lyn Nofziger
 Metrication opposition
 Mendenhall Order
 Plan for Establishing Uniformity in the USA, 1790 report including proposal for decimal system based on the foot
 The Metric Marvels
 United States customary units
 United States Public Land Survey System

References

External links
 The United States and the Metric System (LC 1136) nist.gov Archive.org
 The Metric System in the United States 
 A Metric America: A Decision Whose Time Has Come on nist.gov Archive.org
 Metric Conversion Act of 1975 on nist.gov Archive.org
 www.us-metric.org — U.S. Metric Association (mirror link)
 Mean Mr Metric satire about the (non)conversion to metric units. One of the highest scoring submissions to the Internet Oracle. Originally written by Jim Palfreyman in October 1991.
 Weights & Measures 
 Examples of metric roadsigns in the U.S.
 www.metrication.us — Metrication.us site at Archive.org
 www.metric4us.com — Metric 4 US! site

 
United States
Science and technology in the United States
Economic history of the United States